The 1986 Major League Baseball All-Star Game was the 57th playing of the midsummer classic between the all-stars of the American League (AL) and National League (NL), the two leagues comprising Major League Baseball. The game was held on July 15, 1986, at the Astrodome in Houston, Texas, the home of the Houston Astros of the National League. The game resulted in the American League defeating the National League 3–2 and ended a streak where the NL won 13 of the last 14 games. Boston Red Sox pitcher Roger Clemens was named the Most Valuable Player.

Rosters
Players in italics have since been inducted into the National Baseball Hall of Fame.

American League

National League

Game
Wally Joyner was the first rookie to be elected to the starting team of an All-Star squad by the fans and the 15th rookie overall to actually start in a Midsummer Classic but the evening belonged to Roger Clemens. Roger Clemens made his All-Star Game debut and the game was held in his hometown of Houston. With help from Ted Higuera, Charlie Hough, Dave Righetti and Don Aase, Clemens shut down the National League and started his record setting All-Star Game career.

Clemens pitched three perfect innings, had no hits allowed and no walks allowed, which included only three balls and twenty-one strikes, against the formidable National League lineup earning him the All-Star Most Valuable Player Award. The National League pitching staff struck out twelve batters, a total equaled only three times before in All-Star History: 1934 All-Star Game [National League], 1956 All-Star Game [American League] and 1959 All-Star Game [National League].

In the second inning, Tigers second baseman Lou Whitaker followed a Dave Winfield double with a homer off Mets pitcher Dwight Gooden. By the fourth inning, Fernando Valenzuela had achieved five consecutive strikeouts. This tied him with the All Star record set during the 1934 All-Star Game by Carl Hubbell. Valenzuela struck out Don Mattingly, Cal Ripken Jr., Jesse Barfield, Lou Whitaker and fellow Mexican Teddy Higuera. In the seventh inning, Frank White pinch-hit for Lou Whitaker and hit an 0–2 pitch from Astros pitcher Mike Scott over the wall. White became the 14th player in the history of the All-Star Game to have a pinch-hit home run. The last player to do so was Lee Mazzilli at the 1979 Major League Baseball All-Star Game.

The National League made it interesting in the bottom of the eighth by roughing up Rangers pitcher Charlie Hough for two runs. In the ninth, the National League had runners at first and third with one out when Don Aase got Chris Brown to hit a check-swing grounder for a double play.

This was the last All-Star Game to be entirely played indoors until 2011, when it was played at Chase Field in Phoenix.

Coaching staff

The 1986 All-Star Game turned out to be the final game that Dick Howser (then managing the defending American League and World Champions, the Kansas City Royals) would ever manage. Broadcasters noticed he was messing up signals when he changed pitchers, and Howser later admitted he felt sick before the game. Shortly thereafter, Howser was diagnosed with a brain tumor and underwent surgery. On June 17, 1987, Dick Howser died at the age of 51.

Umpires

Starting lineups

Game summary

References

 1986 All-Star Game on Baseball Almanac
 1986 All-Star Game on Baseball-Reference.com

Major League Baseball All-Star Game
Major League Baseball All-Star Game
Baseball competitions in Houston
Major League Baseball All Star Game
1986 in Houston
July 1986 sports events in the United States